United Nations Security Council Resolution 179 was adopted on June 11, 1963. The parties directly concerned with the situation in Yemen agreed to disengage and the Governments of Saudi Arabia and the United Arab Republic agreed to pay the expenses for a UN observers mission over 2 months.  The Council urged the parties to observe the terms of disengagement and requested the Secretary-General establish the observation operation as he defined and to report to the Council on the implementation of the resolution.

The resolution was adopted with ten votes; the Soviet Union abstained.

See also
List of United Nations Security Council Resolutions 101 to 200 (1953–1965)
North Yemen Civil War

References
Text of the Resolution at undocs.org

External links
 

 0179
North Yemen
 0179
United Arab Republic
1963 in North Yemen
June 1963 events